Kuzminovka is a rural locality (a selo) in Fyodorovsky Selsoviet, Fyodorovsky District, Bashkortostan, Russia. The population was 439 as of 2010. There are 15 streets.

Geography 
Kuzminovka is located 5 km northeast of Fyodorovka (the district's administrative centre) by road. Fyodorovka is the nearest rural locality.

References 

Rural localities in Fyodorovsky District